Shaw Run is a stream in the U.S. state of Pennsylvania. It is a tributary to Turkey Run.

Shaw Run has the name of John Shaw, the proprietor of a carding mill on the stream's banks.

References

Rivers of Pennsylvania
Rivers of Venango County, Pennsylvania